Family Time may refer to:

Family Time (album), by Ziggy Marley (2009)
Family Time (TV series), from 2012
 Family Time (film), a 2023 Finnish-Swedish comedy-drama